is a 1968 Japanese crime film directed by Toshio Masuda. The film stars Tetsuya Watari who plays Goro, a gangster who was sent to prison for three years for stabbing a hitman (Machida Kyosuke) who belonged to the rival gang called the Aokis. On his release from prison, Goro finds out his gang is in decline and learns that the hitman he stabbed is still alive.

Production
Outlaw: Gangster VIP is based on the writings of Goro Fujita, an ex-gangster who wrote the novel the film was based on. The film was the first in a six-part series of films based on Goro Fujita's character.

Release
The film was released in Japan on January 13, 1968. The film was released by Toho International in an English-subtitled version in the United States in May 1968.

Outlaw: Gangster VIP was shown at the Udine Far East Festival in 2005. The film had its Canadian premier at the Fantasia Film Festival on July 14, 2008.

Outlaw: Gangster VIP was released by Arrow Video on Blu-ray and DVD in 2016 as part of a box set of the entire series.

Reception
Jasper Sharp of Midnight Eye stated that "Toshio Masuda didn't make the flashiest of works at Nikkatsu, but he did make solid, reliable movies with great characters and well-crafted plots that always keep the viewer on their toes. Gangster VIP is a far more mature and serious film than most of Nikkatsu's akushun films from the 60s, benefiting from some great acting, especially from its lead Watari (Tokyo Drifter), and the poignant final scenes will stick in one's mind for a long time after the film is over."

Cast
Tetsuya Watari : Fujikawa Goro
Chieko Matsubara : Hashimoto Yukiko
Kayo Matsuo : Yumeko
Kaku Takashina
Sanae Kitabatake
Tamio Kawachi
Kyosuke Machida : Sugiyama Katsuhiko
Yoshiro Aoki : Ueno
Tatsuya Fuji : Suzuki
Mina Aoe : Singer
Mitsuo Hamada : Tsujikawa Takeo

Sequels

Outlaw:Gangster VIP 2　/ 大幹部 無頼
Source:
(Released date April 28, 1968) Directed by Keiichi Ozawa
Tetsuya Watari : Fujikawa Goro
Chieko Matsubara : Hashimoto Yukie
Ryōhei Uchida ; Kiuchi Tsuyoshi
Kunie Tanaka : Nemoto Katsuji
Akira Yamauchi : Kiuchi Ryusaku
Masako Ota : Asami Keiko
Kayu Matsuo : Sugiyama Yumeko
Izumi Ashikawa : Suzuki Kikue
Hideaki Nitani : Asami Kosuke

Outlaw:Heartless / 無頼非情
Source:
(Released date August 1, 1968) Directed by Mio Ezaki
Tetsuya Watari : Fujikawa Goro
Chieko Matsubara : Hashizume Keiko
Koji Wada : Sawada Kenji
Fumio Watanabe : Koga
Kaku Takashina : Hashizume
Ryoji Hayama : Sawada
Isao Tamagawa : Gohara

Outlaw:Goro the Assassin / 無頼　人切り五郎
Source:
(Released date November 2, 1968) Directed by Keiichi Ozawa
Tetsuya Watari : Fujikawa Goro
Chieko Matsubara : Isomura Yuki
Tatsuya Fuji : Hayashida Masahiko
Chitose Kobayashi : Hayashida Shinobu
Masahiko Tanimura : Yosaku
Asao Koike : Kaito Kensaku
Koji Nanbara : Makino Shouji

Outlaw:Black Dagger / 無頼 黒匕首
Source:
(Released date December 28, 1968) Directed by Keiichi Ozawa, screenplay by Kaneo Ikegami
Tetsuya Watari : Fujikawa Goro
Chieko Matsubara : Miura Fujiko / Yuri
Tamio Kawachi
Sanae Kitabatake : Takemiya Sayoko
Kunie Tanaka : Hongo Michio
Kaku Takashina : Igawa
Ichirō Nakatani : Miura Kensuke
Ryoji Hayama : Tsuruoka Tatsuzo
Shigeru Tsuyuguchi : Takemiya Kunimatsu

Outlaw:Kill! / 無頼 殺せ (1969) 
Source:
(Released date March 8, 1969) Directed by Keiichi Ozawa, screenplay by Hideichi Nagahara & Kaneo Ikegami
Tetsuya Watari : Fujikawa Goro
Chieko Matsubara : Asano Yumiko
Koji Wada : Uno Isao
Kenji Imai : Hirakawa Takamatsu
Eiji Gō : Hanai Tetsuji
Shinjirō Ehara : Moriyama Ken

See also
List of Japanese films of 1968
Takeo Kimura filmography

References

Footnotes

Sources

External links
 

Japanese crime films
1968 crime films
Films directed by Toshio Masuda
Nikkatsu films
Yakuza films
1960s Japanese films